Lake City Way is an elevated station on the Millennium Line of Metro Vancouver's SkyTrain rapid transit system, located at the intersection of Lougheed Highway and Lake City Way in Burnaby, British Columbia, Canada. It opened in November 2003, after the initial 2002 opening of the Millennium Line. The station serves a nearby business park and the television studios for CHAN-DT (Global Television Network) and Global News: BC 1, a terrestrial and cable television news channel, respectively.

History
Lake City Way station was opened on November 21, 2003, as an in-fill station, more than a year after the completion of the original portion of the Millennium Line. The station was not opened in 2002 along with the rest of the original Millennium Line stations as it was not part of the original plan for the line; however, the city of Burnaby made a push for the station. The architecture firms Francl Architect and Stantec Architecture were responsible for designing the station.

Station information

Station layout

Entrances

Lake City Way station is served by a single entrance located at the northeast corner of the station.

Transit connections

Lake City Way station provides connections within Burnaby, Vancouver and the Tri-City area. The following bus routes serve the station:

References

Millennium Line stations
Railway stations  in Canada opened in 2003
Buildings and structures in Burnaby
2003 establishments in British Columbia